David Brooks is a Unionist politician from Northern Ireland representing the Democratic Unionist Party (DUP).

Brooks has been a Member of the Northern Ireland Assembly (MLA) for Belfast East since the 2022 election.

References 

Living people
Democratic Unionist Party MLAs
21st-century British politicians
Northern Ireland MLAs 2022–2027
Politicians from Belfast
Year of birth missing (living people)